Valery Sergeyevich Kichin (born 12 October 1992) is a Kyrgyz-Russian professional footballer who plays as a left back or centre back for Russian club Yenisey Krasnoyarsk.

Career

Club
On 27 February 2013, Kichin signed a long-term contract with FC Volga Nizhny Novgorod.

On 2 July 2014, Kichin signed a three-year contract with Anzhi Makhachkala, moving to FC Tyumen on loan in January 2015. After returning to Anzhi at the end of the 2014–15 season, Kichin's contract with Anzhi was terminated by mutual consent on 30 June 2015. Kichin joined Belarusian club Dinamo Minsk in July 2019, where he played until February 2020. On 17 February 2020, he signed with Russian Football National League club Torpedo Moscow until the end of the 2019–20 season.

International
He has been a member of the Kyrgyzstan national football team since 2011.

Career statistics

International

Statistics accurate as of match played 14 June 2022

International goals
Scores and results list Kyrgyzstan's goal tally first.

Honours
Dordoi Bishkek
Shoro Top League (2): 2011, 2012
Kyrgyzstan Cup (1): 2012

Personal life
He is an Orthodox Christian. He is a citizen of Russia since 19.

References

External links

1987 births
Sportspeople from Bishkek
Kyrgyzstani Christians
Kyrgyzstani people of Russian descent
Living people
Kyrgyzstani footballers
Kyrgyzstan under-21 international footballers
Kyrgyzstan international footballers
Association football fullbacks
FC Dordoi Bishkek players
FC Volga Nizhny Novgorod players
FC Khimik Dzerzhinsk players
FC Ufa players
FC Anzhi Makhachkala players
FC Tyumen players
FC Yenisey Krasnoyarsk players
FC Dinamo Minsk players
FC Torpedo Moscow players
Kyrgyz Premier League players
Russian Premier League players
Russian First League players
Belarusian Premier League players
Asian Games competitors for Kyrgyzstan
Footballers at the 2014 Asian Games
2019 AFC Asian Cup players
Kyrgyzstani expatriate footballers
Expatriate footballers in Russia
Kyrgyzstani expatriate sportspeople in Russia
Expatriate footballers in Belarus
Kyrgyzstani expatriate sportspeople in Belarus